Heterometopia is a genus of tachinid flies in the family Tachinidae.

Species
Heterometopia argentea Macquart, 1846
Heterometopia bella Paramonov, 1960
Heterometopia montana Paramonov, 1960
Heterometopia nigra Barraclough, 1992

External links

Dexiinae
Diptera of Australasia
Tachinidae genera
Taxa named by Pierre-Justin-Marie Macquart